The Benjamin H. Averiett House, near Sylacauga, Alabama, was listed on the National Register of Historic Places in 1986.

This property has also been known as the Hudson Hamilton Place.  It includes "Georgia Folk House" architecture.

This was listed along with three other properties as part of a study of the estate.

See also
William Averiett House
Goodwin-Hamilton House
Welch-Averiett House

Notes

References

National Register of Historic Places in Talladega County, Alabama
Houses completed in 1835